MV John J. Boland is a diesel-powered lake freighter owned and operated by the Buffalo-based American Steamship Company (ASC), a subsidiary of Rand Logistics. This vessel was built in 1973 at Bay Shipbuilding Company, Sturgeon Bay, Wisconsin. Initially named Charles E. Wilson, the vessel was renamed to its current name in 2000.

She is a self-unloading vessel, with a  boom, mounting a conveyor belt, that could be swung to port or starboard.

Design and description
The ship is powered by two GM diesel engines rated at  driving one shaft and  bow and stern thrusters. She is a self-unloading vessel, with a  boom, mounting a conveyor belt, that could be swung 105° to port or starboard. The ship has 22 hatches for 6 holds.

Service history
The ship was built under the terms of the Merchant Marine Act of 1970, the first of nine vessels built by the Buffalo-based American Steamship Company, taking advantage of the Act's loan guarantees. She cost $13.7 million USD. The ship was constructed by Bay Shipbuilding at their yard in Sturgeon Bay, Wisconsin with the yard number 710. The ship was launched on March 10, 1973 and completed on September 1 later that year as Charles E. Wilson. The official owner of the ship is the Franklin Steamship Company, a subsidiary of the American Steamship Company, with the exception of a short period in 1978 where the American Steam Ship Company took over. The vessel is registered in Wilmington, Delaware.

Operated by the American Steamship Company on the Great Lakes, Charles E. Wilson served uneventfully until 2000. In January 2000 the third ship to be named John J. Boland was sold and Charles E. Wilson was renamed John J. Boland. On January 2, 2018 John J. Boland was among the ships that became trapped in ice on Lake Erie. The ship was freed by United States Coast Guard vessels on January 4. The ship is currently in service.

References

External links 
 

1973 ships
Great Lakes freighters
Ships built in Sturgeon Bay, Wisconsin